Melek Baykal (born 7 August 1954) is a Turkish actress mostly appearing in theater and TV series. Her roles as Nermin (in TV series Ferhunde Hanımlar), Nurhayat (in the TV series Hayat Bağları) and Pembe (in Cennet Mahallesi) raised her popularity. After playing in Ferhunde Hanımlar in Ankara, she got many proposals to play in TV series and movies. Because of it, she decided to move to Istanbul. Baykal started to her career when she was 17 years old in a theater by playing an 85-year-old woman. She graduated from Ankara State Conservatory worked at Ankara State Theaters for a long time. Melek Baykal had her cinematic debut with a movie named Kaçma Birader. In 2012, she had her own TV program on Star TV.

Theatre

Filmography

References

External links 

1954 births
Actresses from Istanbul
Turkish television actresses
Living people